Andrew Fountaine (c. 1637 – 7 February 1707), of Narford, Norfolk and Bell Bar, North Mymms, Hertfordshire, was an English Member of Parliament. He represented Newtown in March 1679, October 1679 and 1681.

His son, also Andrew Fountaine, was an important art collector.

References

1637 births
1707 deaths
17th-century English people
English MPs 1679
English MPs 1681
Members of Parliament for the Isle of Wight
People from Breckland District
People from Welwyn Hatfield (district)